Bhongirpalle is a village and panchayat in Ranga Reddy district in the Indian state of Telangana. It falls under the Shabad mandal. It is situated about 47 km from Hyderabad.

Languages
The major languages spoken in Bhonagiripalle are Telugu and Urdu. English and Hindi are occasionally used.

Crops
The place is suitable for growing tomatoes. Farmers grow other crops, including flowers and vegetables, as well as rice, jower, cotton and corn.

References

Villages in Ranga Reddy district